Red-bellied turtle can refer to several turtle species:

 Pseudemys alabamensis, the Alabama red-bellied turtle
 Pseudemys nelsoni, the Florida red-bellied turtle
 Pseudemys rubriventris, the Northern red-bellied turtle
 Red-bellied short-necked turtle, a species of turtle in the family Chelidae found in tropical Australia and Papua New Guinea

See also 
 Red-eared turtle
 Red turtle (disambiguation)

Animal common name disambiguation pages